Henrik Samuel Conrad Sjögren (23 July 1899, Köping – 17 September 1986, Lund) was a Swedish ophthalmologist best known for describing the eponymous condition Sjögren syndrome. Sjögren received his medical degree in Stockholm 1927. His first experience with the syndrome was an encounter with a 49-year-old woman with arthritis and extreme dryness of the eyes and the mouth. He worked with his wife, Maria to describe a total of 19 cases and presented these cases for his doctoral theses in 1933, which was published as his doctoral thesis at the Karolinska Institute titled "On knowledge of keratoconjunctivitis" that eventually served as the basis of identifying and naming of Sjögren's syndrome. He had one child born in 1934 named Gunvor.

References

1899 births
1986 deaths
Swedish ophthalmologists
Karolinska Institute alumni
20th-century Swedish physicians